Veronica strictissima, the Banks Peninsula hebe, is a species of flowering plant in the family Plantaginaceae. It is only found on Banks Peninsula in New Zealand.

Description
Veronica strictissima is a randomly branching shrub, small to medium in size, growing to a height of 2 metres. Its name in Latin, strictus, means erect and this refers to the plants erect branches. Its branchlets are often glabrous or have tiny oppositely arranged hairs. These branchlets can be slightly red.

The leaves are narrow and oblong 2–4.5 cm x 6-8mm, they are light green in colour, glabrous, with an entire margin and the lamina ending as a tip. The leaf margin can sometimes have minute hairs lining it. The leaves are simple and arranged oppositely with pairs alternating at 90 degrees along the branch (decussate). The leaf bud has no gap at the base.

The flowers are white, in a raceme spike up to 11 cm long.
The flowers can be hermaphrodite or female. The pedicels are 1-4mm in length and are covered in minute hairs. The calyx is 1.5 – 2 mm long oval in shape and blunt. The corolla tube is hairy inside. Hermaphrodite corolla have dimensions of 1.4–2.4 x 1.3–1.7mm they are slightly longer than the calyx the female corolla tube is 1.3–1.8mm making it equal to or slightly longer than the calyx. The corolla lobes can vary greatly and can be circular, elliptic, oblong obtuse, suberect or recurved. V. strictissima is a gynodioecious plant meaning that some plants are hermaphroditic and other plants are female plants.

The reproductive structures are stamen and the style. The stamen is 3-5mm the anthers are purple in colour, sterile anthers are light brown in colour they 1.2–1.8mm. The style is 2.3-6mm.

The capsules containing multiple tiny seeds. Its branches are obtuse are 2.9–4 x 2.2–2.6mm they can be hairy with three calyx lobes. Seeds are flat and brown; they are 1–1.6 x 0.9–1.3mm.

Natural global range 
Veronica strictissima is native to  New Zealand and endemic to the Banks Peninsula, Canterbury. It is not naturally found in other places unless it has been planted intentionally.

New Zealand range 
Veronica strictissima is native and endemic to the Port Hills and Akaroa regions of Banks Peninsula. And all natural findings of this species have been in these areas with multiple separate populations.

Habitat preferences 
The genus Veronica are fast growing and thrive in sunny open areas, such as scrubland, steep banks and bluffs. V. strictissima, is found only on Banks Peninsula, which has different climatic conditions to the rest of Canterbury area.  V. strictissima has been found to grow at an altitude of around 500m but go from the coast up to at least 800m. It is not very tolerant of shade. But is found to be a ruderal species as they respond well to disturbances.

Life cycle/phenology
Flower initiation occurs after a period of spring growth. V. strictissima begins its summer flowering during the months December through to March and sometimes to June with some plants.  Individual plants will flower for 2–5 weeks. The flowers on the spike of one plant will normally flower at the same time. Capsules will form during the months March through to April and will dehisce seeds in autumn. These seeds are wind dispersed. The seeds can also be dispersed by birds and lizards. The flowers are pollinated by a single native bee Lasioglossum sordidum.

Diet and foraging
Soil composition of Banks Peninsula is different to Lower Canterbury. It is made up of loess and basalt rock, while Lower Canterbury is predominantly alluvial.  V. strictissima is found to prefer soil with moderate levels of moisture with low salinity and good soil drainage.

Predators, parasites, and diseases
Veronica strictissima is eaten by grazing species such as sheep, goats and cows. The fruit are eaten by lizards and birds. Lizards and birds also feed on the nectar. The flowers are pollinated by a native bee, L. sordidum which feeds off the nectar and takes pollen with it. V. strictissima and other species from the genus Veronica are also fed on by hebe plume moth Platyptilia and large hebe loopers Xyridacma veronicae. Hebe gall midges, hebe leaf miner flies and hebe gall mites also live off V. strictissima.

Cultural and medicinal uses
It was used culturally for medicinal purposes as a cure for dysentery. It worked effectively and was used in the second world war. For Maori it was traditionally used for a number of things including a decoction for ulcers, headaches, kidney and bladder troubles.

Other information
Veronica strictissima  can be confused with other hebe species and was once included with Veronica leiophylla as well as Veronica parviflora. It is very similar to Veronica traversii, which is far more widespread, being found in Canterbury, Marlborough and Nelson. There are suggestions that it is able to hybridise with Veronica salicifolia and a possible specimen is found in Wellington Herbarium.

Veronica strictissima provides ecological services by controlling erosion.

References 

strictissima
Banks Peninsula
Flora of New Zealand
Endemic flora of New Zealand